RVS Tukoro is a Pacific Forum patrol boat that performs fishery protection, search and rescue and sovereignty patrols for Vanuatu.  Tukoro is one of twenty-two small patrol vessels Australia designed and built for smaller fellow members of the Pacific Forum, after the United Nations Convention on the Law of the Sea extended control of a  exclusive economic zone for all maritime nations.

Design

Tukoro, like her sister ships, displaces approximately 160 tonnes, and can accommodate a crew of eighteen for missions lasting ten days or less. Australia chose commercial off the shelf equipment, instead of cutting edge military-grade equipment, to ease the maintenance burden for small nations' maintenance facilities.

Operational history

Tukoro was severely damaged on March 14, 2015 by Cyclone Pam. Tukoro was washed ashore on Moso Island. Australia offered to repair the vessel, and provide further training to Vanuatu personnel. The repairs took approximately sixteen months, and the vessel returned to service on August 23, 2016.

In February and March 2017 Tukoro engaged in a joint fishery protection operation with her sister ship from the Solomon Islands, . In September 2017 Tukoro helped provide disaster relief to evacuees after the Ambae volcano eruption.

Australia is scheduled to replace Tukoro was a larger and more capable  in 2021.

References

Pacific Forum class patrol vessels
Naval ships of Vanuatu